Aleksei Yevgenyevich Zolotarenko (born 20 January 1993) is a Russian former football forward.

Career
He made his debut in the Russian Second Division for FC Rus Saint Petersburg on 20 April 2013 in a game against FC Lokomotiv-2 Moscow.

He joined Serbian club FK ČSK Čelarevo in the 2017–18 Serbian First League.

References

External links
 Career summary by sportbox.ru 
 
 
 
 

1993 births
Living people
Russian footballers
Russian expatriate footballers
Expatriate footballers in Belarus
FC Krasnodar players
FC Dynamo Saint Petersburg players
FC Vitebsk players
FK ČSK Čelarevo players
Expatriate footballers in Serbia
Association football forwards
FC Volgar Astrakhan players